Nexhmije Pagarusha  (7 May 1933 – 7 February 2020) was a Kosovo-Albanian singer and actress, often referred to as the queen of Kosovan music. Pagarusha gained acclaim as a recording artist in Kosova and neighbouring countries for her distinct soprano vocal range, which she displayed performing various Kosovan folk songs during her career, which spanned 36 years, from 1948, in her debut in Radio Prishtina, to 1984, in her final concert in Sarajevo. Her music style was not limited just to Albanian music, as she performed rock, pop, funk, opera/classical, and many more.

Biography 
Nexhmije Pagarusha was born in the small village of Pagarusha, near the town of Mališevo, Vardar Banovina, Kingdom of Yugoslavia (present-day Kosovo). She finished primary school in Mališevo and then went to Belgrade, where she attended a music school for three years, in the solo canto section. She began her music career as a singer for Radio Pristina in 1948.

Her musical creative work lasted for almost 40 years, and due to the contrast in genres she performed in, it is not easy to define Pagarusha as a specific type of singer. She sang both folk music and classical music, especially opera. Pagarusha was given titles such as Bilbili i Kosovës (Nightingale of Kosovo), Queen of Kosovar music, and Madame Butterfly.

She performed not just in her own country but also in other European countries, such as Albania, North Macedonia, Bosnia and Herzegovina, Bulgaria etc. She led several tours with the music ensemble Shota in these countries, and also in the Middle East. In Kosovo, she gained the title Këngëtare e shekullit (Singer of the Century).

A song "Baresha" (The Shepherdess), is one of her most popular songs. It was composed by her husband, Rexho Mulliqi and the lyrics were written by Rifat Kukaj. Pagarusha played in many theatre plays and movies and also as an actress she won many prizes.

She ended her music career in 1984 after holding a huge concert in Sarajevo. In 2000 she sang a song called "Për ty" (For You) in an Albanian TV show, after 16 years of absence. She worked as a senior adviser for music on Radio Kosovo and on Radio Blue Sky, both located in Pristina.
She was awarded the "Honor of the Nation" decoration by the President of Albania Bujar Nishani in November 2012.

Nexhmije Pagarusha died on 7 February 2020 due to an unknown disease.

Singles 
Pagarusha interpreted more than 150 songs. Some of her most successful ones are:

 
 
 
 
 
 
 
 
 
 
 
 

Filmography 
 Makedonska krvava svadba, Bloody Wedding (1967) as Nedžmije Pagaruša
 Jugovizija, Jugovision (1973)
 Gëzuar viti i ri, Happy New Year (1976)
 E kafshoja terrin, Biting the darkness (1977)
 I ikuri, Gone (1980)
 Tre vetë kapërcejnë malin, Three people overpass the mountain (1981)
 Lepuri me pesë këmbë, The Five-Legged Hare
 Fluturimi i Micakut, Micak's flight
 Daullet e të çmendurve, The drums of the crazy ones
 Rexha i nënës në grazhd të kalit, Mother's son Rexha in the stall
 Vrasësit bëjnë dasmë natën (1997), The killers throw a wedding at nighttime

See also 
 Music of Kosovo
 Music of Albania

Notes

References

External links

 Fan site in Albanian

1933 births
20th-century Albanian women singers
Kosovan singers
2020 deaths
Kosovo Albanians
People from Mališevo